Eremiaphila uvarovi is a species of praying mantis in the family Eremiaphilidae.

See also
List of mantis genera and species

References

External links
 Photo of an adult female Eremiaphila uvarovi specimen

Eremiaphila
Insects described in 1933